This is a list of Japanese Academy Award winners and nominees.

Best Picture

Best Supporting Actor

Best Supporting Actress

Best Director

Best Adapted Screenplay

Best Cinematography

Best Production Design

Best Costume Design

Best Makeup and Hairstyling

Best Original Score

Best Original Song

Best Animated Feature

Best Animated Short Film

International Feature Film

Honorary Award

Nominations and Winners

See also

 Cinema of Japan
 List of Japanese films

References

Japanese
History of film of Japan
Academy